Grevillea plurijuga is a species of flowering plant in the family Proteaceae and is endemic to southern Western Australia. It is a prostrate to low-lying or dense mounded to erect shrub with divided leaves with linear lobes and loose clusters of hairy, red or pink flowers.

Description

Taxonomy
Grevillea plurijuga was first formally described in 1864 by Ferdinand von Mueller in Fragmenta Phytographiae Australiae from specimens collected by George Maxwell. The specific epithet (plurijuga) means "more yokes", referring to the many leaf lobes.

In 2000, Robert Owen Makinson described two subspecies of G. plurijuga in the Flora of Australia, and the names are accepted by the Australian Plant Census:
The flowers are mostly borne on long, trailing peduncles below the base of the foliage.
The flowers are mostly borne on erect peduncles held above the foliage.

Distribution and habitat
Subspecies plurijuga grows in a range of habitats including heath, woodland and mallee between Norseman, Peak Charles, Esperance, and Cundeelee with and outlier near Southern Cross, in the Coolgardie, Esperance Plains and Mallee bioregions. Subspecies superba grows in shrubland between Grasspatch, Scaddan, the Wittenoom Hills and Mount Ney north of Esperance in the Coolgardie, Esperance Plains and Mallee bioregions of southern Western Australia.

Conservation status
Both subspecies of G. plurijuga are listed as "not threatened" by the Western Australian Government Department of Biodiversity, Conservation and Attractions.

References

plurijuga
Endemic flora of Western Australia
Eudicots of Western Australia
Proteales of Australia
Taxa named by Ferdinand von Mueller
Plants described in 1864